Park Eun-kyung (박은경) (born 1982) is a South Korean nail artist. She opened her nail salon Unistella in 2014 and is now arguably the most famous nail artist in South Korea if not in the world.

She is known for starting the trends of shattered glass manicures, wire manicures, and negative-space manicures.

References 

Nail care
South Korean fashion
Cosmetics people
South Korean artists
1982 births
Living people